Kawasaki is a surname of Japanese origin (most commonly  etc.).

Notable people surnamed Kawasaki
Audrey Kawasaki (born 1982), American artist
Ayumi Kawasaki (born 1984), Japanese vert skater
Carolyn Kawasaki aka Caiya Kawasaki (born 1962), American Gaijin tarento
Guy Kawasaki (born 1954), American author and venture capitalist
, Japanese anime director
Jirō Kawasaki (born 1947), Japanese politician
Kyozi Kawasaki (1930–2021), Japanese physicist
Masahiro Kawasaki (1949–2006), Japanese musician and composer
Minoru Kawasaki (film director) (born 1958), Japanese film director, screenwriter and producer
Minoru Kawasaki (politician) (born 1961), Japanese politician
Munenori Kawasaki (born 1981), Japanese baseball shortstop
Ryo Kawasaki (1947–2020), Japanese musician
Scott Kawasaki (born 1975), American politician
Tomisaku Kawasaki (1925–2020), Japanese pediatrician after whom Kawasaki disease is named
Kawasaki Shōzō (1837 – 1912), Japanese industrialist, and shipbuilder
Toshikazu Kawasaki (born 1955), Japanese paperfolder
, Japanese footballer
Yosuke Kawasaki (born 1977), American musician
Yukari Kawasaki (born 1976), Japanese Olympic archer
Yukiko Kawasaki (born 1977), Japanese figure skater

Fictional characters
Chef Kawasaki, a fictional character from the Kirby series of video games
General Kawasaki, from Ikari Warriors

See also
Kawasaki (disambiguation)

Japanese-language surnames